Rat River Settlement is an informal area within the Rural Municipality of De Salaberry in the province of Manitoba, Canada located east and south of the community of Otterburne, north and south of the village of St-Pierre-Jolys and northeast and southeast of the CP Emerson subdivision's former Carey rail siding.

Bibliography

Notes

Settlements in Manitoba